In the creative arts and scientific literature, an acknowledgment (British acknowledgement ) is an expression of a gratitude for assistance in creating an original work.

Receiving credit by way of acknowledgment rather than authorship indicates that the person or organization did not have a direct hand in producing the work in question, but may have contributed funding, criticism, or encouragement to the author(s). Various schemes exist for classifying acknowledgments; Cronin et al. give the following six categories:
 moral support
 financial support
 editorial support
 presentational support
 instrumental/technical support
 conceptual support, or peer interactive communication (PIC)

Apart from citation, which is not usually considered to be an acknowledgment, acknowledgment of conceptual support is widely considered to be the most important for identifying intellectual debt. Some acknowledgments of financial support, on the other hand, may simply be legal formalities imposed by the granting institution. Occasionally, bits of science humor can also be found in acknowledgments.

There have been some attempts to extract bibliometric indices from the acknowledgments section (also called "acknowledgments paratext") of research papers to evaluate the impact of the acknowledged individuals, sponsors and funding agencies.

Spelling
The spelling acknowledgment is standard in American English and Canadian English. However, the spelling acknowledgement is used in British English, Australian English, and other English-speaking regions.

See also
 Acknowledgment index
 Attribution (copyright)
 Billing (filmmaking)
 Byline
 Closing credits
 Credit (creative arts)
 Opening credits
 Possessory credit
 Signature block
 Title sequence
 WGA screenwriting credit system

References

The arts
Writing
Academic publishing
Collaboration